The 1973 Italian Grand Prix was a Formula One motor race held at Monza on 9 September 1973. It was race 13 of 15 in both the 1973 World Championship of Drivers and the 1973 International Cup for Formula One Manufacturers.

The 55-lap race was won from pole position by Ronnie Peterson, driving a Lotus-Ford, with teammate Emerson Fittipaldi second and Peter Revson third in a McLaren-Ford. Jackie Stewart suffered a puncture early in the race which dropped him to 20th, but charged through the field to finish fourth, which was enough to secure his third (and final) Drivers' Championship.

Stewart's Tyrrell teammate François Cevert finished fifth, scoring what would turn out to be the final points of his Formula One career. Carlos Reutemann completed the top six in his Brabham.

The race also saw Jacky Ickx's last drive for Ferrari, the Belgian returning to the team for its home race having left after the British Grand Prix. Ickx qualified 14th and finished eighth, a lap down on Peterson.

Qualifying classification

Race classification

Championship standings after the race

Drivers' Championship standings

Constructors' Championship standings

References

Italian Grand Prix
Italian Grand Prix
Grand Prix
Italian Grand Prix